Adelbert Wellington Brownlow-Cust, 3rd Earl Brownlow  (19 August 1844 – 17 March 1921), was a British soldier, courtier and Conservative politician.

Background and education
Brownlow was the second son of John Egerton, Viscount Alford, eldest son and heir apparent of John Cust, 1st Earl Brownlow. His mother was Lady Marianne Margaret, daughter of Spencer Compton, 2nd Marquess of Northampton, generally known as Lady Marian Alford. His father had predeceased his own father in 1851 when Adelbert was only seven years old and thus the earldom and estates had passed to Adelbert's elder brother. Adelbert was educated at Eton.

Political career
In 1866 Brownlow was elected to the House of Commons for North Shropshire. However, he was forced to resign his seat the following year when he succeeded in the earldom of Brownlow (and viscountcy of Alford) on the death of his older brother, and entered the House of Lords. He held office under Lord Salisbury as Parliamentary Secretary to the Local Government Board from 1885 to 1886, as Paymaster-General from 1887 to 1889 and as Under-Secretary of State for War from 1889 to 1892 and was admitted to the Privy Council in 1887.

Apart from his political career he was also Lord Lieutenant of Lincolnshire from 1867 to 1921, a Deputy Lieutenant for Hertfordshire and a Justice of the Peace for Shropshire, Hertfordshire, Lincolnshire and Buckinghamshire. He served as treasurer of the Salop Infirmary in Shrewsbury in 1872.

Military career
Brownlow served with the Grenadier Guards as lieutenant from 1863 to 1866, and was later commanding officer of the Bedfordshire Volunteer Infantry Brigade between 1889 and 1892, and Home Counties Brigade in 1895. He was Honorary Colonel of the 4th Battalion of the Lincolnshire Regiment from 1868 to 1908, of the 2nd Volunteer Battalion of the Bedfordshire Regiment from 1883 to 1901, and of the Lincolnshire Yeomanry and 4th Volunteer Battalion of the Hertfordshire Regiment from 1901.  He was awarded the Volunteer Decoration.

Courtier

Brownlow was a Volunteer Aide-de-Camp to Queen Victoria, Edward VII and George V. He was appointed a Knight Grand Cross of the Royal Victorian Order (GCVO) in the 1921 New Year Honours for his services to the Royal Household.

Family
Lord Brownlow married Lady Adelaide Chetwynd-Talbot, daughter of Henry Chetwynd-Talbot, 18th Earl of Shrewsbury, in 1868. They had no children. She died in March 1917, aged 73. Lord Brownlow survived her by four years and died in March 1921, aged 75. On his death the Earldom of Brownlow and Viscountcy of Alford became extinct while he was succeeded in his Barony and Baronetcy by his second cousin, Adelbert Cust.

References

External links 
 

1844 births
1921 deaths
Cust, Adelbert Wellington
Deputy Lieutenants of Hertfordshire
Earls in the Peerage of the United Kingdom
Knights Grand Cross of the Royal Victorian Order
Lord-Lieutenants of Lincolnshire
Members of the Privy Council of the United Kingdom
United Kingdom Paymasters General
People educated at Eton College
Cust, Adelbert Wellington
Brownlow, E3
Lincolnshire Yeomanry officers
Adelbert
Barons Brownlow